Bishop Taras Senkiv, O.M. (born 3 July 1960 in Bilobozhytsia, Chortkiv Raion, Ternopil Oblast, Ukrainian SSR) is a Ukrainian Greek Catholic hierarch as an Eparchial Bishop of Ukrainian Catholic Eparchy of Stryi since 2 June 2005 (until 21 November 2011 in rank of Eparchial Bishop). Previously he served as an Auxiliary Bishop of Stryi from 22 May 2008 until 20 January 2010 and as an Apostolic Administrator of the same Stryi from 20 January 2010 until 2 April 2014 as a Titular Bishop of Siccenna.

Life
Bishop Senkiv was born in a family of clandestine Greek-Catholics in Western Ukraine. He joined a clandestine theological seminary at age 17, simultaneously working various jobs.

He was clandestinely ordained as priest by Bishop Pavlo Vasylyk on May 28, 1982, and worked as pastor among the faithful of the "Catacomb Church" until 1989, mainly in Western Ukraine. From 1989 until 1992 he served as Dean of Chortkiv Deanery and from 2001 until 2002 as a Synkellos of the Ukrainian Catholic Eparchy of Buchach. During 1992–2000 Fr. Senkiv continued his theological studies in the Theological Seminary in Olomouc, Czech Republic and Palacký University in the same city, obtaining a licentiate degree in theology. On February 15, 2002 he joined the religious order of Minims in Italy and was professed on October 1, 2006.

On May 22, 2008 Fr. Senkiv was appointed and on July 20, 2008 was consecrated to the Episcopate as the Auxiliary Bishop of the Ukrainian Catholic Eparchy of Stryi. The principal consecrator was Cardinal Lubomyr Husar, the Head of the Ukrainian Greek Catholic Church.

References

1960 births
Living people
People from Ternopil Oblast
Palacký University Olomouc alumni
Minims (religious order)
Ukrainian Eastern Catholics
Bishops of the Ukrainian Greek Catholic Church